Siddhartha is an orchestral suite by Canadian composer Claude Vivier, which was completed in 1976.

Composition
Vivier was commissioned to write an orchestral piece by the Canadian Broadcasting Corporation. He was inspired by Hermann Hesse's novel Siddhartha (1922), whose main character follows the teachings of Buddha. The work was completed in 1976, but it could not be premiered by the National Youth Orchestra of Canada under Marius Constant as planned, as they believed it was too difficult.

It was finally premiered on 14 March 1987, four years after the composer's death, in Montreal, by the Orchestre Métropolitain under the direction of Walter Boudreau, one of Vivier's former classmates at the Conservatoire de musique du Québec à Montréal.

Instrumentation
Woodwinds
3 Flutes
4 Oboes
4 Clarinets
3 Bassoons
Brass
4 French Horns
3 Trumpets
3 Trombones
Tuba
Percussion
Timpani
Vibraphone
Strings
30 Violins
12 Violas
10 Cellos
8 Basses

References

Citations

Sources
 

1976 compositions
Compositions by Claude Vivier
Compositions that use extended techniques
Adaptations of works by Hermann Hesse